William Joseph McCormack (21 February 1933 – 8 September 2016) was Chief of Police of the Metro Toronto Police from 1989 to 1995. He succeeded Jack Marks. Earlier in his life McCormack was a marine radio operator and British colonial police officer before coming to Canada in the late 1950s.

Life and career
McCormack was born in Beau-Bassin, Mauritius, then went on to graduate from Atlantic College in Dublin in 1951. McCormack went to sea and as a civilian employee of the Marconi International Marine Communication Limited aboard British Merchant Navy ships where he served as a radio officer on several ships.

He is the son of British Colonial Police colonel William McCormack who was decorated with an MBE by the King for his work with prison reform and children's polio.

The younger McCormack served as a Constable in Bermuda Police Force from 1955 to 1959 before coming to Canada and joining the Metropolitan Toronto Police. Before becoming chief of police, he spent a number of years as a homicide detective in Toronto.  Following his retirement, he detailed his experiences and some of his notable cases in a co-authored book.

He had five children, four of whom later became police officers. Michael is the former president of the Toronto Police Association, leaving that position in 2020., Kathy is an OPP sergeant, and Jamie is a Toronto police detective.  A son also named William resigned from his post as a plainclothes Toronto police officer in 2009 following an internal misconduct investigation; criminal charges for soliciting and accepting bribes in that regard were subsequently stayed for 6 years of excessive delays by Crown prosecution, with the judge laying blame on the lead police investigator.

In 2007, he joined other former Toronto chiefs, including David Boothby, Jack Marks and Julian Fantino at a 50th anniversary celebration of the Toronto Police Service at the headquarters building. McCormack died on 8 September 2016 at the age of 83.

Awards
 Police Exemplary Service Medal (1983)
 Bar to the Police Exemplary Service Medal (1989)
 Queen Elizabeth II Golden Jubilee Medal (2002)
 Queen Elizabeth II Diamond Jubilee medal (2013)

References

External links
 The Governor General of Canada – Honours > Find a Recipient
 

1933 births
2016 deaths
Toronto police chiefs
Canadian people of Scottish descent